RAAF Base Tindal  is a Royal Australian Air Force (RAAF) military air base and civil aviation airfield located  east southeast of the town of Katherine, Northern Territory in Australia. The base is currently home to No. 75 Squadron and a number of non-flying units, and also hosts the civilian  Katherine Tindal Airport (also known as the Katharine Tindal Civilian Airport). First constructed in 1942, it was refurbished in the late 1960s as a bare base capable of being utilised when required. It was opened as a permanently manned RAAF base in 1989.

History

Tindal was initially built for the RAAF as Carson's Airfield in 1942. The airfield was constructed by the US Army's 43rd Engineer General Service Regiment. Its purpose was to provide a base for Consolidated B-24 Liberator heavy bombers that could strike at Japanese targets in Papua New Guinea and the Dutch East Indies, but the turning tide of the war rendered this unnecessary and no aircraft were deployed there before the cessation of hostilities. In 1946, the airfield was renamed in honour of Wing Commander Archibald (Archie) Tindal, the first RAAF member killed in action on the Australian mainland during World War II; he died while manning a machine gun against Japanese raiders bombing Darwin on 19 February 1942, and was buried at the Adelaide River war cemetery.

In 1959, the Chief of the Air Staff, Air Marshal Sir Frederick Scherger, proposed building a second airfield in the Darwin area. Like Tindal, he had been in Darwin when it was bombed by the Japanese in 1942, and believed that Australia's defences in the north needed to be strengthened. Following a survey, Tindal was selected in May 1963 as being close enough to RAAF Base Darwin to afford mutual protection, but far enough from the coast to be defensible and to avoid the effects of tropical cyclones. Other factors, such as being outside the projected nuclear fall-out zone should Darwin be targeted by a nuclear weapon, as well as an adequate water supply and suitable road and rail connections, also influenced the decision.

Conceived as an "Un-Manned Operational Base" (later to be known as a bare base), Tindal was to have no permanent staff and very few buildings. Essentially it would consist of a runway, taxiways and hardstanding along with the minimal infrastructure, such as electricity and water, to permit it to be activated when required.  No. 5 Airfield Construction Squadron commenced work in 1964 and the  runway was completed in March 1967, at a cost of $7 million. The base was ready to support RAAF units by early 1968, though work expanding its facilities continued through 1968 and 1969.

In 1984, the Australian government decided to move the RAAF's fast jet base in the Northern Territory from Darwin to Tindal to more effectively control the sea-air gap, in keeping with its strategic policy of defence in depth. After a major upgrade, RAAF Tindal became operational on 1 October 1988, the first new manned base to be established since World War II. It was officially opened on 31 March 1989, the RAAF's 68th anniversary, by Prime Minister Bob Hawke. The opening was originally planned for July 1988 but was delayed due to difficulties finding a date suitable to both Hawke and the Minister for Defence, Kim Beazley. Since its establishment, Tindal has remained the RAAF's main operational base in the Northern Territory. It has regularly hosted other units for exercises and supported the Australian-led intervention during the 1999 East Timorese crisis, and No. 75 Squadron's deployment for the 2003 invasion of Iraq. In keeping with Tindal's position in the northern area of operations, it is manned exclusively by uniformed personnel. In 2004, it was awarded the RAAF's Hawker Siddeley Trophy for most proficient base of the previous year.

In 1997, an Antonov An-124 Ruslan aircraft carrying weapons and four helicopters belonging to the mercenary company Sandline International was diverted from its planned destination in Papua New Guinea to Tindal during the Sandline affair. The helicopters were subsequently stored at the base, without Sandline being charged rent. Two Mil Mi-17 troop carriers were sold in 1999, but the two remaining helicopters, Mil Mi-24 gunships, remained unsold. As of 2015, the Australian Defence Force was seeking to dispose of them during 2016. Both helicopters were buried at the Shoal Bay Landfill site near Darwin during 2016.

Australian F-111s and RNZAF A-4K Skyhawks were armed and on standby at the base ready to attack Indonesian forces and command systems during the tension in 1999 during the establishment of East Timor's independence and the deployment of the Australian-led International Force for East Timor.

The Australian Government announced in February 2020 that it would spend $1.1 billion upgrading RAAF Base Tindal. Works will include extending its runway and increasing fuel storage. This project followed $500 million of works undertaken so that the base could efficiently operate Lockheed Martin F-35 Lightning II fighters.

Modernization work at Royal Australian Air Force (RAAF) Base Tindal is funded by the U.S. government, and its scope was confirmed by Australian officials on October 31, 2022. Changes at the base include an expanded apron with space for six B-52s, facilities for squadron operations and maintenance infrastructure. The B-52 bombers are nuclear-capable, which has been met with some opposition and concern that their stationing will increase tension with China. The RAAF responded by stating that USA bombers have been visiting Australia since the 1980s and engaging in training exercises in Australia since 2005.

Once completed, the air base will better accommodate bomber formations as well as tankers and fighters, with work also affecting fuel and ammunition storage and mission planning buildings. Currently, Tindal is the permanent home of a single RAAF F-35A stealth fighter squadron.

The cost of the squadron's operations and maintenance facilities at Tindal is estimated at $14.4 million, with the total value of base modernization reaching $100 million.

Australian officials have told reporters that the project is currently in the "planning phase" and work is expected to be completed by the end of 2026.

Military units
The following units are located at RAAF Base Tindal: 

In addition, there is RAAF Military Police, who operate as part of the Joint Military Police Unit, as well as the Army's NORFORCE Regional Force Surveillance Unit has a detachment located at Tindal.

General aviation
A general aviation apron and civilian passenger terminal were built under an agreement between the RAAF and Katherine Town Council. The civilian area is known as Katherine Tindal Civilian Airport. Passenger aircraft as large as the Boeing 737 can use the airport.

Airlines and destinations

See also
 List of Royal Australian Air Force installations
 List of airports in the Northern Territory

References

External links

Tindal
Military installations in the Northern Territory
Tindal
1942 establishments in Australia
Katherine, Northern Territory
Military airbases established in 1942